The North Carolina Heritage Award is an annual award given out by the North Carolina Arts Council, an agency of the North Carolina Department of Natural and Cultural Resources, in recognition of traditional artists from the U.S. state of North Carolina. The award was created in 1989.

Since 1989, the North Carolina Heritage Award has honored North Carolina's most eminent folk artists. Recipients of the Heritage Awards range from internationally acclaimed musicians to folks who quietly practice their art in rural and family settings. A dozen North Carolinians have gone on to receive the National Heritage Fellowship Awards presented by the National Endowment for the Arts. These awards deepen our awareness of the rich and diverse cultural traditions of people in North Carolina. The Heritage Award has become one of the most important and influential programs developed by the Folklife Program of the North Carolina Arts Council.

Recipients receive a cash award and are honored in a ceremony that highlights their achievements. The Award ceremonies are a notable celebration and educational event for North Carolinians, drawing large and enthusiastic audiences.

From the Award’s beginning, the Folklife Program of the North Carolina Arts Council engaged talented photographers — Rob Amberg, Cedric N. Chatterley, Mary Anne McDonald, Roger Haile and Bill Bamberger — to document the artistry of award recipients. Their images and the program book articles celebrate and commemorate the skills, values, aesthetics, and meaning of traditional arts in North Carolina.

The Folk Heritage Award recipients from 1989–1996 are also featured in a special issue of the North Carolina Folklore Journal.

Recipients

1989
Dorothy Auman and Walter Auman, potters
Etta Baker (1913–2006), Piedmont blues guitarist and singer
Thomas Burt, Piedmont blues guitarist, banjoist, and singer
Thomas Hunter, fiddler
Emma Taylor, basketmaker
Doug Wallin, ballad singer
Eva Wolfe, basketmaker

1990
The Badgett Sisters, gospel singers
Walker Calhoun, Cherokee musician and dancer
Earnest East, fiddler
Benton Flippen (b. 1920), fiddler
Wilma McNabb, weaver
Dellie Norton, ballad singer
Sally Parnell, rag-rug weaver

1991
Effie Rhodes Bell, quilter
Lela Brooks, Tobacco twine crocheter
Burlon Craig, potter (Some biographical information is in the Catawba Valley Pottery article)
Menhaden Chanteymen, performers of worksongs 
Hazel Rhodes Reece, quilter
Quay Smathers
Thurman Strickland, basketmaker
Joe Thompson, fiddler
Odell Thompson, fiddler

1992
Obadiah Carter, RandB musician 
Bertie Dickens, old-time banjo player 
Emma Dupree, herbalist and healer 
The "5" Royales, R&B artists
Leonard Glenn, banjo and dulcimer maker
Ray Hicks, storyteller
Algia Mae Hinton, blues guitarist and buck dancer
Lauchlin Shaw, fiddler
A. C. Overton, old-time banjo player

1993
Louise Anderson, storyteller 
Julian Guthrie, boatbuilder
Bea Hensley, blacksmith
George Higgs, blues musician
Mary Jane Queen, ballad singer
George SerVance Jr., woodcarver
Luke Smathers and Harold Smathers, stringband musicians

1994
Carroll Best, banjo player
Aaron Buff, chair maker
Robert Dotson, flatfoot dancer
John Dee Holeman, blues guitarist and buck dancer
Quentin "Fris" Holloway, bluesman and buck dancer
Vernon Owens, potter
Amanda Swimmer, potter
Elsie Trivette, rug maker
Doc Watson, guitarist and singer

1995
The Branchettes: Lenna Mae Perry and Ethel Elliot, gospel singers
Raymond Coins, stone and wood carver
Homer Fulcher, Julian Hamilton Jr., decoy carvers
Big Boy Henry, blues guitarist and singer 
Virgil Ledford, woodcarver
Jim Shumate, bluegrass fiddler
Ora Watson, fiddler

1996
Robert H. Bushyhead, storyteller and language preservationist
Verlen Clifton and Paul Sutphin, stringband musicians and singers
Nell Cole Graves, potter
Elizabeth "Lee" Graham Jacobs, quilter 
Dock Rmah, Jarai traditional musician
Earl Scruggs, banjo player

1998
Bessie Killens Eldreth, singer
Louise Bigmeet Maney, potter
Smith McInnis, Fiddler
Ossie Clark Phillips, weaver
Arthur "Guitar Boogie" Smith, country musician
Arliss Watford, woodcarver
The Wilson Brothers, gospel singers

2000
Faircloth Barnes, gospel singer and preacher 
Amanda Crowe (1928–2004), Cherokee wood carver
Marvin Gaster, old-time banjo player
Bobby McMillion, singer, musician, and storyteller
Melvin Lee Owens, potter
James Allen Rose, model boat builder

2003
The Briarhoppers, bluegrass musicians
Celia Cole Perkinson and Neolia Cole Womack, potters
Emmet Parker Jones, wheelwright
Bishop Dready Manning, gospel musician
Oscar "Red" Wilson, stringband musician
Jerry Wolfe, stickball carver

2007
 Senora Lynch, potter

2013
Bobby Hicks, fiddle player
Susan Morgan Leveille, weaver
Bill Myers, band leader, The Monitors
Arnold Richardson, Haliwa-Saponi artist

2014
William E. Meyers, jazz saxophonist and educator

2016
Sheila Kay Adams, ballad singer, storyteller
H. Ju Nie and H. Ngach Rahlan, Montagnard-Dega weavers
Jamie Lewis, and Houston Lewis, boat builders
Maceo Parker, funk musician
Marc Pruett, banjo

2018
Asha Bala (Performer and instructor of South Indian dance) 
Glenn & Lula Bolick (Potters, musicians, and storytellers)
Arvil Freeman (Western North Carolina fiddler)
Robert "Dick" Knight (Soul, R&B, and jazz trumpet player) 
Tony Williamson (Multi-genre mandolinist rooted in bluegrass)

See also
National Heritage Fellowship

References

External links
 Carolina Heritage Award'''
 North Carolina Arts Council

North Carolina culture
Awards established in 1989
Arts awards in the United States
1989 establishments in North Carolina